Prince Edward, Duke of York and Albany,  (Edward Augustus; 25 March 1739 – 17 September 1767) was the younger brother of George III of the United Kingdom and the second son of Frederick, Prince of Wales, and Princess Augusta of Saxe-Gotha.

Early life
The young prince was baptised Edward Augustus, at Norfolk House, by The Bishop of Oxford, Thomas Secker, and his godparents were his great-uncle The King in Prussia (for whom The Duke of Queensberry stood proxy), The Duke of Brunswick-Wolfenbüttel (who was represented by Lord Carnarvon), and his maternal aunt The Duchess of Saxe-Weissenfels (for whom Lady Charlotte Edwin, a daughter of the late 4th Duke of Hamilton, stood proxy). As a boy, Edward, with his brother, went through long hours of schooling in arithmetic, Latin, geometry, writing, religion, French, German, Greek and even dancing to be well rounded.

Seven Years War

Prince Edward showed an interest in naval affairs and sought permission to serve with the Royal Navy. He participated in the naval descents against the French coast taking part in the failed Raid on St Malo, which ended in the Battle of St. Cast in 1758.

He was promoted to captain of HMS Phoenix on 14 June 1759. He was made Rear-Admiral of the Blue in 1761, vice-admiral of the blue in 1762, and in 1766, only a year before his death, rising to the rank of Admiral of the Blue.

Later life

He was created Duke of York and Albany and Earl of Ulster by his paternal grandfather, George II, on 1 April 1760. When Edward's brother ascended the throne on 25 October 1760 as George III, he named Edward a privy counsellor. From the time his brother became king and until the birth of the king's first child, the future George IV, on 12 August 1762, the duke was heir presumptive to the British throne.

On 27 July 1765, he was initiated into the Masonic Order.

In the late summer of 1767, on his way to Genoa, the duke fell ill and had to be landed in the harbour of Monaco. Despite the care and attention he was given, he died in the Palace of Honoré III, Prince of Monaco, on 17 September. The state bedchamber where the ill duke died has since been known as the York Room.

After his death, his body was returned to London aboard , and is interred in Westminster Abbey.

Legacy

Literature
In 1762, James Boswell published "The Cub at Newmarket", a poem which he dedicated to Prince Edward, without getting his permission.  Boswell met the prince at the Newmarket races in 1760 during his first visit to London. The cub referenced in the work is Boswell himself. The dedication reads:

Prince Edward is an important character in Norah Lofts' historical novel The Lost Queen (1969), chronicling the life of his youngest sister, Caroline Matilda, Queen Consort of Denmark and Norway as wife of King Christian VII. Edward is mentioned as having had a special link with her, stronger than with his other siblings. The book also depicts Edward as having planned shortly before his death to elope with a commoner woman with whom he was in love, marry her in Russia and never go back to Britain – which is not firmly attested in historical sources.

Places and people named after Prince Edward
Prince Edward County, Virginia.
Cape York, the tip of the Cape York Peninsula in Far North Queensland, is the northernmost point on the Australian continent.
The Duke of York Islands (formerly ) in East New Britain Province, Papua New Guinea. They are found in St George's Channel between New Britain and New Ireland islands and form part of the Bismarck Archipelago.
Duke of York Island, the largest island of Duke of York Islands, Papua New Guinea.
Prince Edward Augustus, fourth son of King George III, who was born the day after the Duke was buried at Westminster Abbey.
Fort Edward, a town in New York located on the eastern side of the Hudson River which was formerly the site of a large British fort during the Seven Years' War.

Titles, styles, honour and arms

Titles and styles
25 March 1739 – 1 April 1760: His Royal Highness Prince Edward
1 April 1760 – 17 September 1767: His Royal Highness The Duke of York and Albany

Honours
1752: Royal Knight of the Garter (KG)
1760: Privy Counsellor (PC)
1760: Royal Fellow of the Royal Society (FRS)

Arms
Edward was granted use of the arms of the kingdom, differenced by a label argent of five points, the centre bearing a cross gules, the other points each bearing a canton gules.

Ancestors

References

External links

1739 births
1767 deaths
Princes of Great Britain
Heirs to the British throne
House of Hanover
Dukes of York and Albany
Peers of Great Britain created by George II
Earls of Ulster
Peers of Ireland created by George II
Knights of the Garter
Burials at Westminster Abbey
People from Westminster
Children of Frederick, Prince of Wales